The Romanov Empire, also known as the Imperial Throne, formerly the Russian Empire (Российская Империя), is a state proposed by Russian businessman and politician Anton Bakov as a re-creation of the Russian Empire. It would be led by Romanov heir Prince Karl Emich of Leiningen as Emperor Nicholas III, with Bakov serving as Archchancellor.

By 2017, Bakov had alleged to have held talks with the heads of several countries in order to purchase a territory in which to establish a legitimate, "non-micro" state. These have included Montenegro, North Macedonia, Albania, The Gambia, Antigua and Barbuda, and Kiribati. In early 2017, it was reported that Bakov was interested in acquiring three Pacific islands belonging to Kiribati in order to establish a "revived Romanov Empire". Preliminarily, Kiribati authorities led by president Taneti Maamau were content with the offer, but later rejected it. According to Bakov, it was related to an inner Kiribati political struggle.

Since 2012, Bakov also held similar talks with governments of The Gambia. He had support from president Yahya Jammeh and was allowed to make engineering measurements for future construction of artificial islands to deploy the Empire's physical territory. But after Gambia's 2016 regime change further talks failed. In 2019 Bakov published a book called "The state is You!" where he disclosed in detail how his talks with the abovementioned governments went on. He reported that he initially was always met with enthusiasm, the officials gladly took money from him and promised support but later were all giving up. In 2020 Bakov declared that his new project, successor to the Empire, entitled Arca Noë is going to be based in neutral Mediterranean waters close to Venice as a part of Seasteading movement. As  of February 2023, the website of the project is not available.

History

Foundation
Bakov declared the new Russian Empire to be the successor to the historical Russian Empire that ceased to exist in 1917. The Imperial Throne also claimed the right to maritime territories that were either claimed by the Russian Empire or discovered by the Imperial Russian Navy but never absorbed into the Soviet Union. The 17 claimed territories include the entire continent of Antarctica and land under the jurisdiction of Japan, the United Kingdom, the United States, and other nations.

Bakov declared himself prime minister and announced a constitution and state symbols. The empire began to issue its own passports online for 1,000 rubles (US$31), and by 2014 it claimed it had granted about 4,000 passports to citizens.

Proponents of the new Russian Empire purport it to be the successor of the historical Russian Empire founded by Peter the Great in 1721. As such, the nation stakes its claim to unpopulated territory that belonged to the historical Russian Empire through "right of discovery", but which was not claimed by the Soviet Union after the 1917 Russian Revolution. It does not claim land that was part of the historical Russian Empire that is now part of Finland, Poland, or the former Soviet republics.

In June 2012, Bakov registered the Monarchist Party with the Russian Ministry of Justice, with a stated goal of restoring the monarchy to Russia in accordance with law. It is the only legalised monarchist party in Russia. In the fall of 2013, Bakov's daughter Anastasia Bakova (Анастасия Бакова) was the Monarchist Party's candidate in the mayoral elections in Yekaterinburg.

In July 2013, Bakov claimed his nation granted citizenship to Edward Snowden, who at the time was in Moscow Sheremetyevo Airport seeking amnesty in Russia.

Accession of Prince Karl Emich 

On 31 March 2014, under the new name of the Imperial Throne, the micronation issued a manifesto announcing itself a sovereign nation and declaring that Prince Karl Emich of Leiningen (born 1952) had become its head with the title of Nicholas III, Emperor of All Russia, as a successor to Nicholas II. The title claim emerged upon the Prince's conversion from Lutheranism to Eastern Orthodox Christianity on 1 June 2013.
Karl Emich descends from the House of Romanov through his grandmother, Grand Duchess Maria Kirillovna (1907-1951), eldest child of Grand Duke Kirill Vladimirovich, who in 1924 claimed the Russian crown from exile following the execution of his cousin Nicholas II in 1918.

The Imperial Throne claimed that by his conversion, Prince Karl Emich had fulfilled the accession requirements of Articles 35 and 53 of the Fundamental Laws of the Russian Empire last established in 1906. Prince Karl Emich accepted the Orthodox name Nikolai Kirillovich (Николай Кириллович) to become Nicholas III, and his (third) wife, née Countess Isabelle von und zu Egloffstein, who also converted, accepted the name Yekaterina Fyodorovna (Екатерина Фёдоровна).

The manifesto and new constitution, signed by Nicholas III, proclaimed the goal of the Imperial Throne as consolidating people all over the world devoted to Christian monarchism. In this document, the Imperial Throne renounced all territorial claims of the Russian Empire (micronation).

Montenegro, Macedonia, Albania, Antigua and Barbuda, Gambia, Kiribati

Later Bakov announced he has purchased a plot of land in Montenegro to form a location for the new state (80 ha, "twice as big as Vatican"), and claimed to be in negotiations with Montenegro authorities on state's recognition. He has also informed that Russian President Vladimir Putin refused to grant such a plot in Ekaterinburg (Bakov's residence and place of the 1918 Romanov assassination) in response to Karl Emich's request passed to Putin by Bakov, a former MP. In early 2015, as a follow-up to the International sanctions during the Ukrainian crisis, Bakov told the press there were talks with Montenegro authorities to establish an offshore zone at this plot, aimed at providing financial intermediation to Russian companies. Also in early 2015 Imperial Throne representatives claimed to be in talks with the authorities of the neighboring Republic of Macedonia and Albania on possible collaboration and future state recognition. In particular, Bakov held meeting with Macedonian Prime Minister Nikola Gruevski. Later there were the alike talks with President of the Gambia Yahya Jammeh at the 70th UN General Assembly session in USA (The Wall Street Journal later reported there are plans to continue Gambian talks after Jammeh was replaced by new president). Also, talks were held with Macedonian and Montenegro Eastern Orthodox clergy — Bakov discussed creation of churches associated with Imperial Throne and proposes canonization of Russian ancient ruler Ivan III and his wife Sophia Palaiologina, of Macedonian origin, who played significant roles in bringing Christian monarchy to Russia. Talks with Gaston Browne, Prime Minister of Antigua and Barbuda, also took place.

In May 2016 talks were held with government of Kiribati to invest US$350 million into development of tourism on three uninhabited islands: Malden Island, Caroline Island and Starbuck Island, aiming to build a "Romanov Empire" micronation there with the capital on the Malden Island. According to Bakov, "a great number of Russian patriots who are not happy with Putin's regime" are expected to arrive when the initial constructions are completed. In February 2017, Radio New Zealand announced that the Kiribati government had rejected the offer. Bakov later claimed it wasn't the final decision and that it was related to an inner Kiribati political struggle.

Bakov has been in the alike talks with Gambia since 2012. In December 2017 he announced that the proposed declaration of partnership was finally signed and new Gambia authorities, headed by Adama Barrow, had recognised the Romanov Empire. Bakov's land development companies now plan to create artificial islands in vicinity of the Gambian capital Banjul to establish territory for the Empire. The 6-year design works and talks took $6 million, and after recognition documents would be ratified, Gambian budget would receive $60 million. At a press conference, Bakov also said he was in talks on recognition with 5 other undisclosed countries. Furthermore, Bakov had also proposed Russian Olympic athletes, who were recently denied attendance to 2018 Winter Olympics, to compete under Romanov Empire flag.

Arca Noë

In 2019 Bakov published a book called "The state is You!" where he disclosed in detail how his talks with the aforementioned governments went on. He reported that he initially was always met with enthusiasm, the officials gladly took money from him and promised support but later were all giving up. He suggests there was some hidden resistance against him on unknown grounds. According to the book, the 7-years Gambia campaign included plain fraud towards him in the course of regime change and concurrent chaos in one of Africa's poorest nations while initially he was allowed by Yahya Jammeh to make measurements of oceanic bottom for future artificial islands and the whole engineering draft was completed (headed by his sons who have engineering education). He emphasized that many people who talked to him about devotion to Christian Monarchy and God were actually interested only in money. So, he decided to relocate the artificial islands into neutral Mediterranean waters near Venice and call the new project Arca Noë (likeness of Noah's Ark), joining the movement of seasteading. Citizens of the Romanov Empire will be converted into new project members. He is going to start off after the coronavirus pandemic restrictions for travel are cancelled.

Bylaws, insignia, structure
According to its constitution,"the Imperial Throne is a sovereign state, a constitutional monarchy, the successor of the All-Russian Imperial Throne, and its claimed "predecessor", the Roman and Byzantine thrones. Romanov Empire is the only state in the world in which the principle of sortition is used to form the upper House of Parliament of the State Duma."

Romanov Empire aims to use modern technologies and plans to use cryptocurrencies, declaring bitcoin the national currency and seeking investments via Initial coin offering.

Council of ministers
The nation's website proclaims a council of ministers (similar to the council of ministers set up by the actual Russian Empire), composed of the following:

 Prince Anton Bakov — Chairman
 Stanislav Belkovsky — Deputy Chairman
 Tatiana Ignatova — Minister of Finance
 Mikhail Strass — Minister of Bread and Land
 Mikhail Verskajn — Minister of the Imperial Palace
 Kirill Zhesterov — Minister of Justice
 Modou Lamin Saidykhan — Minister of Foreign Affairs
 Prince Ilya Bakov — Minister of Investment

Senate

The Yekaterinburg Senate is an independent civil governing body organized by Bakov aimed to provide social control for official Yekaterinburg authorities such as City Duma (Council). It was created shortly after 2013 elections. So far, 6 sessions were held where several infrastructure and social projects were presented, some included direct interaction with officials. Up to 100 volunteer "senators" are active at the sessions, such as Kirill Formanchuk. Bakov announces the scheme of a parliament with this Senate is supposed to be implemented in Romanov Empire when it's physically constructed. The Empire's supposed parliament is compared to resemble usual two-house parliament "turned upside-down" and based on demarchy.

Proposed Imperial Palace

After he was named Emperor, Nicholas III wrote a letter to Vladimir Putin requesting land in Yekaterinburg to establish a capital with its own imperial senate. The request was denied.

Symbols 
The coat of arms of the "Russian Empire" consisted of a double-headed eagle. The flag of the empire is the St. Andrew's Cross, which was the Russian Navy Ensign, The St. Andrew's Cross flag is also currently used as the party flag for the Monarchist Party of The Russian Federation, which Anton Bakov is the President and Chairman of said party.

With the transformation into the Imperial Throne, the coat of arms was changed to a black Russian Imperial Eagle with the Chi Rho symbol in the escutcheon. Bakov emphasized the Chi Rho symbolizes the formation of the Christian Monarchy in the Roman Empire by Constantine the Great who saw the symbol in the skies before the Battle of the Milvian Bridge in 312 AD. The eagle holds in its talons the sceptre and globus cruciger, two of the most prominent symbols of Christian monarchy.

References 

Micronations
States and territories established in 2011
Russian monarchy
Monarchism in Russia